Duke of Finland (in Finnish Suomen herttua; Swedish hertig av Finland) was an occasional medieval title granted as a tertiogeniture to the relatives of the King of Sweden between the 13th and 16th centuries. It included a duchy along with feudal customs, and often represented a veritably independent principality. Grand Duke of Finland was a nominal royal title used by Swedish monarchs from the 1580s until 1720, which was revived again briefly from 1802 to 1805 (then as Great Prince of Finland) and was also used by Russia's monarchs until 1917.

History of actual duchy

Bishop-Duke Kol
In the late 15th century, historian Ericus Olai claimed that Bishop Kol of Linköping (died about 1196) had been the Duke of Finland (Dux Finlandiae). In the late 12th century in Sweden, the Latin title "dux" was still used in the meaning of jarl and came to mean duke only a hundred years later (see Swedish duchies). Ericus Olai's claim is not supported by other sources. However, some historians date the small Stenberga Castle in Masku to the late 12th century, when the Novgorodian wars reached Finland and may have resulted in a temporary Swedish military presence in the area.

Noteworthy is also that the Bishop of Linköping had some sort of connection to eastern activities during the 13th century. The Pope used him in 1229 to assist the Bishop of Finland in organizing the diocese, and the first known Duke of Finland, Benedict, soon after his nomination was also elected Bishop of Linköping. The Bishop of Linköping had also accompanied the Swedish ledung on their unsuccessful Estonian expedition.

Bishop-Duke Benedict Birgerson

Benedict (1254–1291), an eccleasiastic, the youngest brother of king Valdemar I of Sweden was  granted the Duchy of Finland about 1284 by a subsequent brother on the throne, King Magnus III. Benedict's appointment ended a 35-year-long period of episcopal rule in Finland, effective since the Second Swedish Crusade around 1249.

Benedict's local reign did not last long. The Duke, a consecrated priest and the Chancellor of the Realm, was elected Bishop of Linköping in 1286. As far as is known, he bore revenues from Finland until his death but did not attempt any independent rule there. He was the first known holder of the appanage of Finland.

Duke Valdemar

The youngest son of the late King Magnus III of Sweden (1240–90), Valdemar (1280s-1318), was given his late uncle Benedict's Duchy of Finland at the coronation of his eldest brother King Birger of Sweden in 1302. Valdemar's elder brother Duke Eric in the 1310s was establishing a truly independent principality in Western Sweden, Duke Valdemar being his ally. There is no evidence that Duke Valdemar succeeded in having as independent a position as Eric, but it is obvious that Valdemar used his ducal revenues to assist Eric's campaign against the King and kept his Finnish appanage and administration under Eric instead of the King.

In 1315, in alliance with Eric, Valdemar gained Turku castle and Häme Castle together with their provinces, that is most of Finland, as well as Stockholm Castle, most of Uppland and Borgholm with Öland, as the result of their revolt against the King. On December 10, 1317 he was imprisoned by King Birger in Nyköping together with Eric. Sometime in 1318, Dukes Valdemar and Eric died while incarcerated.

With his second wife Ingeborg of Norway, Duke Valdemar had a son, born in 1316, who is assumed to have died as a child.

Duke Benedict Algotson

Lord Benedict Algotsson (1330–60), accused for political reasons by Saint Bridget of being a homosexual lover of King Magnus IV of Sweden (nephew of Duke Valdemar above), had already in 1353 been recognized as Duke of Halland, originally a Danish principality, and in 1353 or 1354 also was given the Duchy of Finland.

The Duke apparently never seriously attempted to establish himself as ruler of Finland, being satisfied to bear revenues from the duchy. He had his seat in Southern Sweden, where he also acted as Viceroy of Scania.

The Duke became the victim of certain nobility's opposition to King Magnus, was exiled in 1357, and killed without an heir in 1360. In 1357, his holdings, including Finland, had been given (without the title) to King Eric, then co-ruler with Magnus. Eric did not need the ducal title, and it was then vacant almost 200 years.

Duke John the Elder: from duchy to grand duchy

In 1556, two hundred years after it was vacated by the removal of Duke Benedict, King Gustav I of Sweden (reigned 1523–1560) gave the Duchy of Finland to his second son, the then 18-year-old Prince John (1537–1592). John was the only holder of the title to establish a genuine princely rule of his own in Finland. The duchy included the Southwest Finland, Raseborg together with Western Uusimaa, and Lower Satakunta. The duchy thus formed was given extraordinarily independent feudal rights by the King. Additionally, John was appointed Governor-General of Finland, including all the other areas beyond the Gulf of Bothnia and up to the eastern border. Those areas were however not held by feudal right but with John as a royal appointee.

Duke John settled in Turku, where he created a cultivated princely court at the Turku Castle. He was an enthusiastic patron of arts and architecture and decorated the castle with splendor never before seen in Finland. Before his marriage, he had a Finnish mistress, Kaarina Hannuntytär. Several Finnish and Swedish families claim descent from their offspring. After the death of his father, John ran his own foreign policy which at times was at odds with his elder brother King Eric XIV of Sweden (reigned 1560–1568). In domestic affairs too, John soon opposed the King, together with a party of high nobility who all were against an increasing centralization of the government. On October 4, 1562, against the wishes of the King, John married his first wife Princess Catherine Jagellonica (1526–1583), daughter of King Sigmund I of Poland (1467–1548). Eric regarded this conduct as rebellion. John and Catherine were imprisoned at Gripsholm Castle the year after their wedding and after a siege of Turku Castle and its conquest by royal troops. The imprisoned Duke considered himself to have kept his title, while the duchy itself was administered by royal officials.

Eric was deposed by John, who had been released, acting with leaders of the nobility in 1568, and John and ascended the throne of Sweden, reigning until his death in 1592 as King John III. In 1589 he appears to have made arrangements to grant the Duchy of Finland at birth to his younger son Duke John (see below).

In 1581, King John III additionally assumed the subsidiary title of Grand Prince of Finland and Karelia. Karelia was soon dropped from the title and considered part of Finland in an expanded eastern extent. The title became established in Latin renderings, and later in the 19th century also in English, as Grand Duke of Finland, however using the Finnish (ruhtinas) and Swedish (furst),  for a crowned or sovereign prince, in its local renderings.

John the Younger

Shortly before his death, King John III, the previous Duke of Finland, gave his old Duchy and its title as a royal duke to John the Younger (1589–1618), his newborn son in a second marriage to Gunilla Bielke (1568–1597). King Sigmund (III) of Poland and Sweden, half-brother of John the Younger, seems to have confirmed this appanage.

A royal chancellery administered the duchy on behalf of the child-duke and provided him with his allotted revenues. However, when Duke John approached adulthood, his duchy was exchanged in 1606 for that of Östergötland which previously had been held by King John's brother, the late Duke Magnus. Duke John the Younger married his first cousin Princess Maria Elisabeth of Sweden (1596–1618). They died childless.

From 1590 to 1599 John's father and half-brother (as most subsequent monarchs until 1720) continued to call themselves Grand Dukes of Finland.

Gustav Adolf

Crown Prince Gustav Adolf (1594–1632), elder son of Charles IX of Sweden, as heir apparent was made Duke of Finland in 1606, while Östergötland was assigned to his cousin Duke John the younger instead. Gustav Adolf then started to receive ducal revenues from Finland. When he ascended the throne of Sweden in 1611 he readopted Grand Duke of Finland among his titles. He was the last to have a real feudal principality of Finland and revenues therefrom.

List of Dukes and Duchesses of Finland
Includes Swedish Lords of Finland by other titles.

No duke of Finland has left descendants in marital lines which survive today. Except John III's legitimate descent (kings of Sweden and Poland are totally extinct since 1672), lineage of all the others became extinct upon their own death or at the death of an only surviving legitimate child.

See also
 Monarchy of Finland
 Grand Duchy of Finland
 Dukes of Swedish Provinces
 List of Finnish monarchs
 Governor-General of Finland

References

Medieval Finland
Finland under Swedish rule
Rulers of Finland
Finland
Finnish nobility